SR50 may refer to:

 Aprilia SR50, an Italian built scooter
 Simson SR50, an east-German built scooter; see Simson (company)
 TI SR-50, a calculator
 Knight's Armament Company (KAC) SR-50, a .50 caliber semi-automatic sniper rifle designed by Eugene Stoner
 State Road 50 or State Route 50; see List of highways numbered 50